Kim Hye-song (or  ; born 9 March 1993) is a North Korean long-distance runner.

Marathoner Kim Hye-gyong is her sister. They are fraternal twins. Hye-song is the eldest of the two. According to their coach, Jong Myong-chol, Hye-song is more conservative and quiet than her sister. The coach considers their healthy rivalry in races and friendship a key to their success.

Kim represents the Pyongyang Sports Team. Together she and her sister train five times a week, running  a day.

The sisters Kim, along with Kim Mi-gyong (no relation) are considered the most prominent of North Korean female marathoners today.

Career
Kim is from Sariwon, North Hwanghae Province. She and her sister started running in middle-school at the age of 14. Their father was a marathon coach at that time. Kim trained at a sports school in Kumchon County. At the age of 14, she won both the 3,000 m and 5,000 m events at a national competition between sport schools. The sisters then moved to the capital Pyongyang. Kim finished fifth at the half marathon of the 2010 Pyongyang Marathon and was subsequently chosen to represent North Korea in the national team.

She could not join her sister in the 2015 Hong Kong Marathon serving as that year's Asian Marathon Championship due to a left hamstring injury. Kim took part in the women's marathon at the 2015 World Championships in Athletics in Beijing, China, finishing 9th.

International competitions

References

External links

1993 births
Living people
North Korean female marathon runners
Athletes (track and field) at the 2014 Asian Games
Athletes (track and field) at the 2018 Asian Games
World Athletics Championships athletes for North Korea
People from Sariwon
Athletes (track and field) at the 2016 Summer Olympics
Olympic athletes of North Korea
Asian Games bronze medalists for North Korea
Asian Games medalists in athletics (track and field)
Medalists at the 2018 Asian Games
21st-century North Korean women